WASL (100.1 MHz, "Jack FM") is an FM radio station  broadcasting a variety hits format. Licensed to Dyersburg, Tennessee, United States, the station is owned by Burks Broadcasting, through licensee Dr Pepper Pepsi-Cola Bottling Company of Dyersburg, LLC (dba Burks Beverage).

History
On March 5, 2015 WASL changed their format from mainstream rock (branded as "SL100") to variety hits, branded as "100 Jack FM".

Previous logo

References

External links

ASL
Radio stations established in 1968
1968 establishments in Tennessee
Jack FM stations
Adult hits radio stations in the United States